Ureña is a city and the shire town of Pedro María Ureña Municipality, Táchira in Venezuela. It is located on the border with Colombia. The city was founded by Pedro María Ureña, having been elevated to the category of parish by means of the provincial law of December 4, 1851.

References

Cities in Táchira
Colombia–Venezuela border crossings